Yarranlea is a rural locality in the Toowoomba Region, Queensland, Australia.

History 
Hermitage Provisional School opened in 1883 and by 1900 had become Hermitage State School. In 1901 it was renamed Yarranlea State School. The school closed in 1977. It was at 4688 Gore Highway. Note that there was another Hermitage State School near Warwick. 

St Michael's Anglican Church was dedicated on 23 February 1891 by Bishop William Webber. On Friday 17 January 1936 it was blown down in a storm. By July 1940 insufficient funds had been raised to rebuild the church. Its altar ornaments were relocated to a Children's Corner within St. Andrew's Anglican Church in Pittsworth.

Education 
There are no schools in Yarranlea, but primary and secondary schools are available in neighbouring Pittsworth.

References 

Toowoomba Region
Localities in Queensland